Debbas is a surname. Notable people with the surname include:

 Charles Debbas (1885–1935), Eastern Orthodox Lebanese political figure
 J. Abdo Debbas, Ottoman Greek who served as American vice-consul at Tarsus
 Ralph Debbas (born 1987), Lebanese automotive entrepreneur, designer, and businessman